The Finger Rock Rearing Unit is a Colorado Parks and Wildlife cold water fish production facility located near Bear River in Routt County at the base of Flat Tops Wilderness Area.

History
Finger Rock Rearing Unit was inaugurated in 1950. The facility is 34 acres and spanning 7,999 ft - 8,219 ft in elevation and is between two cattle ranches off Colorado Highway 131 south of Yampa.

Mission
An overarching mission among the hatchery staff is creating healthy and sustainable populations of trout among Colorado's waters. DOW field biologists monitor these practices.

Fish Species
Hatchery staff works to support the raising of 460,000 fingerling rainbow trout and brown trout, and 170,000 catchable-sized rainbow trout. They stock these species in as far north as Steamboat Lake to Poudre River Valley in northwestern Colorado. The fish are kept in hatchery and nursery ponds. Between these two areas, they hold approximately 650,000 fish. Their source of water comes from a groundwater spring.

References 

Fish hatcheries in the United States
Buildings and structures in Routt County, Colorado
Tourist attractions in Colorado